Aspendale railway station is located on the Frankston line in Victoria, Australia. It serves the south-eastern Melbourne suburb of Aspendale, and opened in April 1891 as Aspendale Park Racecourse. It was renamed Aspendale on 1 August 1905.

History
Aspendale station opened in April 1891 and, like the suburb itself, the station was named after Aspen, a race-winning mare owned by James Crooke, who had purchased land east of the present-day station to build the former Aspendale Racecourse. The first race meeting at the racecourse was in 1891, coinciding with the opening of the station.

In 1966, a crossover at the up end of the station was abolished. On 1 December 1969, the goods yard was closed to traffic.

In 1977, boom barriers replaced interlocked gates at the Groves Street level crossing, located at the down end of the station. In 1981, the current station buildings were provided.

In 1992, another crossover at the station was abolished, as well as the connection to the former siding.

In early 2014, a man was hit and killed by a Frankston-bound train, causing the boom gates at the level crossing to stay down, meaning that road traffic could not travel between the Nepean Highway and Station Street.

In October 2022, it was announced that Aspendale would be lowered into a trench, as part of the removal of seven level crossings on the line. Further details, designs and a construction timeline were to be released closer to the opening of the new station in 2029.

Platforms and services
Aspendale has two side platforms. It is served by Frankston line trains.

Platform 1:
  all stations and limited express services to Flinders Street, Werribee and Williamstown

Platform 2:
  all stations services to Frankston

Transport links
Ventura Bus Lines operates one route via Aspendale station, under contract to Public Transport Victoria:
 : Mordialloc – Chelsea station (off-peak only)

Gallery

References

External links
 
 Melway map at street-directory.com.au

Railway stations in Melbourne
Railway stations in Australia opened in 1891
Railway stations in the City of Kingston (Victoria)